Euchaetis crypsichroa is a moth in the family Oecophoridae. It was described by Oswald Bertram Lower in 1893. It is found in Australia, where it has been recorded from South Australia.

References

Moths described in 1893
Euchaetis